Power Glen is a hamlet located in the St. Andrew's Ward of the city of St. Catharines, Ontario, Canada.

It can trace its history back to 1786 when Robert Hamilton acquired from a Mr. Duncan Murray, a mill site on the waters of Twelve Mile Creek. This mill operated until 1800 as a sawmill. In 1811, a grist mill was added by a Mr. Peter Thomas. The community came to be known as Crown Mills. In 1854, a Mr. Benjamin Reynolds bought the site and added a wagon and buggy factory, 12 workers' homes, and a boarding house. Fossing and Second operated a wood pulp mill, and Thomas Moffat and William Reynolds manufactured wagons. The village name changed to Reynoldsville at this time.  As electricity began to be introduced, the Cataract Power Company of Hamilton constructed a power plant not far downstream from the mills. They changed the name of the community to Power Glen, which it retains today. Until 1970, the hamlet was located in Louth Township. It was during that year that the City of St. Catharines amalgamated with the eastern half of Louth Township. For many years, the hamlet remained isolated in the south west corner of the City of St. Catharines.  Recent growth of the new Vansickle subdivision has encroached on the former village.  This is a mixed blessing, as the residents of Power Glen may now enjoy the amenities of city life while still retaining the unique character of this quiet southern Ontario community.

References
 https://web.archive.org/web/20051102090319/http://www.ieee.org/organizations/history_center/decew.html

Neighbourhoods in St. Catharines